Michelle Selesky Giuda (born Michelle Mai Selesky; February 18, 1985) is an American businessperson and former government official. 

As of 2021, she is Executive Vice President of Geopolitical Strategy and Risk at the Weber Shandwick public affairs firm. She has served as United States Assistant Secretary of State and acting Under Secretary of State, where she led the largest restructuring of the U.S. State Department in 20 years. She is an NCAA gymnastics champion.

Early life and education
Giuda was born Michelle Mai Selesky in San Juan Capistrano, California, on February 18, 1985. Her mother had fled Vietnam days before the Fall of Saigon in April 1975. Her father served in the U.S. military during the Vietnam War. 

Giuda graduated from Aliso Niguel High School in Aliso Viejo in 2003, then graduated with honors from the University of California, Los Angeles (UCLA) in 2007 with a Bachelor of Arts degree in political science. In 2008, Giuda earned a Master of Professional Studies in political management from George Washington University.

Gymnastics career
In 2000, Giuda won the California high school state championship in floor exercise and placed second in the all-around competition. She competed one year in high school, then exclusively trained and competed at the Club level. She trained at the National Gymnastics Training Center in Aliso Viejo, California.

At UCLA, Giuda was a four-year gymnast, twice serving as a team captain. She was a member of the 2004 UCLA National Championship team and a four-time NACGC academic All-American. She earned All-Pac-10 honors on vault. Her teammates included Olympians Kristen Maloney, Jamie Dantzscher, Mohini Bhardwaj, Kate Richardson, Tasha Schwikert, and Yvonne Tousek.

In 2009, Giuda was featured in a UCLA television advertising campaign highlighting student-athletes.

Professional career

She worked for five years as a senior member of former Speaker Newt Gingrich's communication team including time as the National Deputy Press Secretary for his 2012 presidential campaign.

PR News named her one of the 30 Under 30 Rising Stars in 2015.

In 2018, Giuda was the Senior Vice President for Global Corporate Communications for Weber Shandwick, the youngest member of their 21-person Global Leadership Team. That year, the Asian American Business Development Center named her one of the "Outstanding 50 Asian Americans in Business." 

Giuda was sworn in as United States Assistant Secretary of State for Public Affairs February 3, 2018. On February 12, 2019, she was appointed the acting Under Secretary of State for Public Diplomacy and Public Affairs. As acting Under Secretary, on May 28, 2019, Giuda merged the Bureau of Public Affairs and the Bureau of International Information Programs to form the Bureau of Global Public Affairs, and assumed the newly-formed position of Assistant Secretary of State for Global Public Affairs. She remained as acting Under Secretary until March 3, 2020, when Ulrich Brechbuhl took on the duties under delegation of authority.

In March 2020, Giuda became Executive Vice President of Geopolitical Strategy and Risk at Weber Shandwick.

References

External links

 Michelle S. Giuda
 
 

1985 births
Living people
UCLA Bruins women's gymnasts
The Graduate School of Political Management alumni
United States Assistant Secretaries of State
United States Under Secretaries of State
California Republicans
Sportspeople from Aliso Viejo, California
Sportspeople from San Juan Capistrano, California
American women of Vietnamese descent in politics
California politicians of Vietnamese descent
Trump administration personnel
21st-century American women
Asian conservatism in the United States